Dog Island may refer to:

Islands

Anguilla
 Dog Island, Anguilla

Antarctica
Dog Island (Antarctica)

Australia
 Great Dog Island (Tasmania)
 Little Dog Island, Tasmania
 South East Great Dog Islet, Tasmania

British Virgin Islands
 Dog Islands, 
 East Seal Dog Island
 George Dog Island
 Great Dog Island
 Little Seal Dog Island
 West Dog Island

Canada
 Dog Island (Nunavut)

The Gambia

 Dog Island, Gambia

New Zealand
 Dog Island (New Zealand)

United States
 Dog Island (Florida)
 Dog Island Light
 Dog Island (New York)

U.S. Virgin Islands
 Dog Island, U.S. Virgin Islands

Other
 The Dog Island, video game

See also
L'Île-aux-Marins, Saint Pierre and Miquelon, formerly known as "Île-aux-Chiens"
Kitsissuarsuit, Greenland, formerly known as "Dog's Island"
 Isle of Dogs (disambiguation)
Canary Islands, known in its native Spanish as Islas Canarias, which ultimately derives from its Latin name Canariae Insulae meaning Islands of the Dogs.